Teniente Coronel Luis A. Mantilla International Airport  is a high elevation airport serving Tulcán, capital of the Carchi Province of Ecuador.

There is rising terrain in all quadrants.

Accidents and incidents
TAME Flight 120, a Boeing 727-100, en route from Quito, Ecuador, crashed into the side of the Cumbal Volcano, nearby Teniente Airport on 28 January 2002. There were no survivors of the 87 passengers and 7 crew on board.

See also
Transport in Ecuador
List of airports in Ecuador

References

External links
OpenStreetMap - Tulcán
OurAirports - Tulcán
SkyVector - Tulcán
Bing Maps - Tulcán

Airports in Ecuador
Buildings and structures in Carchi Province